Carroll Wayne Belardi (September 5, 1930 – October 21, 1993) was an American professional baseball player. The first baseman and native of St. Helena, California, appeared in 263 games in Major League Baseball over all or parts of six seasons (1950–1951; 1953–1956) for the Brooklyn Dodgers and Detroit Tigers.

Baseball career

Dodgers
Belardi played baseball at Bellarmine College Preparatory of San Jose, where he graduated in 1948. He also attended Santa Clara University. Big and powerful, he began his career in the Dodgers' farm system in 1949, playing part of that season for the Nashua Dodgers of the New England League, but due to economic hard times, the league was on shaky footing and Belardi was promoted to Triple-A before the New England circuit failed in midseason. 

In Brooklyn, Belardi's path was blocked by the presence of eight-time National League All-Star first baseman Gil Hodges, then entering the prime of his career. In 1953, he appeared in 69 games, including 36 starts at first base, as the Dodgers won their second consecutive National League pennant. Belardi batted .239 over the regular season, with 11 home runs and 34 runs batted in. He came to bat twice in the 1953 World Series as a pinch hitter, going 0 for 2 as the Dodgers fell to the New York Yankees in six games.

Tigers
In 1954, Belardi was used strictly as a pinch hitter during the season's early months, collecting two hits and two bases on balls in 11 plate appearances, before Brooklyn traded him to the Tigers for three players and cash in a June 9 waiver deal. In Detroit, he received an extended opportunity to play, getting into 88 games, with 71 starts at first base. Again, he hit 11 home runs and set a personal best with 58 hits, but he batted only .232 with 24 runs batted in. Most of Belardi's  season took place in the minor leagues, as he made only three appearances as a pinch hitter for the Tigers during April. 

It was his last season in the majors. In MLB, Belardi posted a .242 career batting average (143-for-592) with 71 runs, 13 doubles, 5 triples, 28 home runs, 74 RBIs and 66 bases on balls. Defensively, he recorded a .986 fielding percentage primarily as a first baseman and a few games as an outfielder.

Late career
During the 1956–1957 offseason, he was included in a couple of significant trades. On December 5, Detroit sent him to the Kansas City Athletics in an eight-player deal. Then, on February 19, 1957, he was a part of a transaction—which would include 13 players in all—he was sent to the Bombers along with pitchers Bobby Shantz and Art Ditmar and young third baseman. Belardi never made the Yankees roster. He spent the final year of his professional career by hitting .220 in 1957 with their Double-A farm team, the New Orleans Pelicans. 

Belardi's baseball career was curtailed by injuries he suffered in a car accident. He died at age 63 in Santa Cruz, California.

References

External links

1930 births
1993 deaths
Baseball players from California
Brooklyn Dodgers players
Buffalo Bisons (minor league) players
Deaths from diabetes
Deaths from hepatitis
Detroit Tigers players
Fort Worth Cats players
Greenville Spinners players
Major League Baseball first basemen
Mobile Bears players
Nashua Dodgers players
New Orleans Pelicans (baseball) players
People from St. Helena, California
St. Paul Saints (AA) players
San Francisco Seals (baseball) players
Bellarmine College Preparatory alumni